California High-Speed Rail (also known as CAHSR or CHSR) is a publicly funded high-speed rail system currently under construction in California in the United States. In 1996, the California Legislature and Governor Pete Wilson established the California High-Speed Rail Authority with the task of creating a plan for the system, and then presenting it to the voters of the state for approval. In 2008, voters approved the plan as specified in Proposition 1A, with a route connecting all the major population centers of the state, authorized bonds for beginning implementation, and establishing other requirements.

The CAHSR system is currently being implemented in phased segments. The first of the dedicated HSR segments, the Interim Initial Operating Segment ("Interim IOS"), is being constructed now in the San Joaquin Valley portion of California's Central Valley. It will run from Merced to Bakersfield, and is planned to begin operations in 2030 (or slightly later). Concurrently, in the major metropolitan areas of San Francisco Bay Area and Greater Los Angeles, the commuter rail systems are being upgraded for improved safety and service, and to support a "blended system" in the future with CAHSR sharing upgraded tracks, power, train control, and stations. Extending the Interim IOS to connect to the northern and southern metropolitan segments is dependent on future funding, so their timing is uncertain.

The high-speed rail system is anticipated to provide environmental benefits (reducing pollution and carbon emissions), traffic benefits (improving passenger travel, and reducing vehicular traffic and air travel congestion), and economic benefits (especially in the Central Valley). The implementation of the project has been controversial due to its selected route, management, delays in land acquisition and construction, cost over-runs, and inadequate funding for finishing the entire system.

Current status and plans
  
By 2022, there had been some significant concern about the slow pace of the project and its increasing costs. In June 2022, Governor Newsom pushed for the release of the last of the Proposition 1A bond funds in order to get an operating system working in the Central Valley. In concert with this, SB 198 was signed into law. It requires the Authority to make the Interim IOS its top priority. Per the 2023 Project Status Report, the Authority indicates the Interim IOS will go into service before Dec. 31, 2030, with a "risk factor" of three years (which runs until the end of 2033).

After completing the Interim IOS, the Authority plans to advance construction on the Merced-San Jose segment, linking the Central Valley to the tracks of the Caltrain commuter rail system. This will allow HSR trains to run from San Francisco to Bakersfield. Funding for construction of this segment has yet to be secured. The Authority is also aggressively seeking additional federal funds.

The California High-Speed Rail Peer Review Group (established by the California Legislature) has noted a number of concerns about the progress of the project, including issues acquiring property in the Central Valley, delays due to lawsuits, an early lack of requisite management experience, and weak legislative oversight. Inflation has also become a major concern due to the disruptions caused by the COVID-19 pandemic and the War in Ukraine.

The project will require legislative action, so the issues raised by the Peer Review Group and KPMG, the Authority's project consultant, will help the legislature select from the Board's proposed plans or other alternatives.

As of March 10, 2023, the California State Rail Modernization Plan (2023 Draft) was available for review.

Phased implementation plan
Phase 1 runs from San Francisco to Los Angeles and Anaheim, and is being implemented in sections. In the Central Valley there is massive construction underway, and more is in preliminary processing. The Authority is currently constructing  of guideway and structures. At each end, the Interim IOS will connect to other transit systems for passenger transfers. "Bookend" investments are also being made in the Bay Area and Southern California upgrading existing infrastructure to improve local rail transit as well as support eventual HSR service.

Per the 2023 Project Update Report, "In consultation with the FRA [Federal Railroad Administration], and in light of cost estimates, the Authority is proposing to construct [the] Merced and Bakersfield [extensions] in phases as federal funding is awarded."

The next implementation priority of the Authority is to provide an HSR link from the Interim Initial Operating Segment to Gilroy (to the west of Merced) and a "blended" system link to San Jose (to the north of Gilroy). This will enable a "blended" route from San Francisco to Gilroy, and an HSR route from Gilroy to Bakersfield. This will allow HSR trains to provide a "one seat ride" from San Francisco to Bakersfield. However, there is no funding as yet identified for this segment, or for the following ones.

The last major construction element in Phase 1 is completing the route from Bakersfield south to Anaheim (in the Greater Los Angeles area). While future planning and funding to complete this segment are indeterminate, part of it already has had some "bookend" investments made in the metropolitan area.

Phase 1 must be operational before Phase 2 is built. Phase 2 will extend the HSR system north to Sacramento and south to San Diego. These extensions are still in the preliminary planning stages.

2022 Business Plan and 2023 Project Update Report
 
On Feb. 18, 2023 the 2023 Project Update Report information was released (the report itself was released on Mar. 1, 2023). Some of the updated information included here is:
 An updated program baseline budget and schedule.
 Updated capital costs to complete Phase 1.

The 2022 Business Plan included information regarding the project's status, goals, and activities. In order to make an effective, self-supporting Initial Operating Segment, due to financial constraints the Authority is focusing on five areas:

 Creating the infrastructure for a viable Interim IOS. That means adding the additional  to create an  HSR-operable segment between Merced and Bakersfield, and creating the train stations along the route. Advanced design contracts have been awarded for both extensions, and work on route acquisition and construction will be performed as funding becomes available. On October 10, 2022 the contract for the first phase of station creation (expected to take about 30 months) was let.
 Creating an operational HSR system for testing. A Track and Systems contract will need to be let to install tracks, power, and control systems for the initial  of right-of-way, and HSR train sets will need to be acquired to test on it. When the track and systems work along the initial  is completed (the 2023 Project Update Report projects this to be by 2028), there will be a two-year period of testing the HSR trainsets, trackage, and control systems while construction proceeds on the Merced and Bakersfield extensions. The Authority plans to restructure and re-issue the Track and Systems procurement in 2023. The 2023 Project Update Report projects the purchase of these to be made in 2024.
 Readying the entire Phase 1 system for construction. The segments from San Francisco to Palmdale and from Burbank to Los Angeles have already been environmentally cleared. Palmdale to Burbank is expected to be approved in 2023, and Los Angeles to Anaheim in 2024. As each segment is cleared the Authority plans to complete its advanced design and engineering. The goal is to have all segments in Phase 1 ready for construction when funding becomes available.
 Continuing to advance "bookend" investments. In Northern California, these include electrification of Caltrain, grade separations, and an automatic train control system between San Francisco and San Jose. The Authority will also be working with Union Pacific Railroad to extend electrification to Gilroy, since the selected "blended" route between San Jose and Gilroy uses the UPRR alignment. In Southern California, these include phase A of Link Union Station, which through-tracks LA Union Station, and other improvements such as early grade separations in the Burbank-to-Los Angeles shared corridor, the Rosecrans-Marquardt grade separation, and an automatic train control system. These investments provide immediate benefits in the San Francisco and Los Angeles areas, while also readying those transit systems for eventual shared use by HSR trainsets. 
 Opening the Interim IOS to passenger traffic before 2031. SB 198 (passed by the legislature and signed into law in June 2022) prioritized getting the Interim IOS into operation. The Merced station will provide a transfer point to the Altamont Corridor Express (ACE) and San Joaquins (Amtrak) rail routes to Sacramento and the Bay Area (San Francisco and Oakland) as well as local buses. The Bakersfield station will have a transfer to Thruway Bus Service for travel to Southern California.

Also, a major addition to the development and operation plan is a new emphasis on risk analysis and risk mitigation (with these now integrated into the formal authorization process), and contingency reserves are being increased. Revenue and expense projections indicate that constructing an operable  segment is feasible.

Financial status and plans

The CAHSR's latest financial projections are discussed in detail in its 2022 Proposition 1A Funding Plan (September 2022) and the 2023 Project Update Report (which is discussed at the end of this section). The legislature also had both of these documents reviewed by an independent accounting agency, and no significant problems were noted.

As of September 2022, the Authority's plans indicated $23.4 billion in identified funding through 2030, with funds coming from Proposition 1A bonds, a number of federal grant program awards, and 25% of California's cap-and-trade auction proceeds. These will go towards a budgeted allocation of $17.9 billion for Central Valley construction (about ), design work for the Merced and Bakersfield extensions, the "bookend" projects now underway, completing the environmental clearances and design work needed for all of Phase 1, station construction, plus $4.6 to $6.0 billion for double-trackage, extension construction, and trainsets for the Interim IOS.

As of November 2022, the Authority was seeking an additional $8 billion in funding via grants from the federal government. Should it be awarded, this funding will allow the Authority to leverage its resources and use the additional federal funds for:
Double-tracking the initial 119 miles (the first priority),
Construction and land acquisition to advance the extension south to Bakersfield,
Purchase of the trainsets needed for the Initial Operating Segment operations,
Design of the Merced and Bakersfield extensions, and
Construction of the initial five HSR stations.

Per the 2022 Business Plan, the expected new funding will be budgeted to:
"Deliver an electrified two-track initial operating segment connecting Merced, Fresno and Bakersfield as soon as possible.
Invest statewide to advance engineering and design work as every project section is environmentally cleared.
Leverage new federal and state funds for targeted statewide investments.
Develop a funding strategy to extend high-speed rail beyond the Central Valley and to the Bay Area as soon as possible."

The funding and budget strategy is now to leverage existing state funds and use matching federal funds to achieve the optimal result in project investments. Table 3.3 in the 2022 Business Plan (on p. 55) shows how the Authority is matching the proposed funding with the different project results. For example, "System-Wide Advancement/Start Bay Area Connection" (see figure above) includes advanced design as well as right-of-way acquisition in the San Jose to Merced segment.

Per the 2023 Project Update Report, there are significant inflationary pressures which will cause budget increases. The Authority reports that the cost increases projected are in line with other HSR project cost increases (e.g., the UK "HS2" HSR rail project, and the Gateway Project in the Northeast Corridor). The Authority is also approaching the extensions differently by advancing design to the configuration-level (generally about 30% of all design), and is procuring right-of-way in advance of construction work needs.

 Early Operating Segment (Merced to Bakersfield). The total cost increase estimate until operational implementation of the Early Operating Segment (Merced to Bakersfield) at P65 is $7.5 billion. The total cost ranges from $29.8 billion to 32.9 billion.

Northern California Extension (Merced to San Francisco). The total cost to operational implementation of the Northern California Extension (Merced to San Francisco) ranges from $21.2 billion to $35.5 billion. (see Note below).

Southern California Extension (Bakersfield to Anaheim). The total cost to operational implementation of the Southern California Extension (Bakersfield to Anaheim) ranges from $31.9 billion to $52.8 billion. (See Note below).

Entire Phase 1 System (San Francisco to Anaheim). The total cost to operational implementation of the Entire Phase 1 System (San Francisco to Anaheim) ranges from $88 billion to $128 billion. (See Note below).

Note:  A major unknown in these estimates is the cost of tunneling, which will not be known until exploratory field studies are done.

The 2023 Project Update Report notes that permanent funding programs do not exist for high-speed rail, either nationally or in California. Current CAHSR funding for the project is estimated at about $25 billion. Of this California has contributed about 85% ($21.5 billion, assuming Cap-and-Trade stays at current levels through 2030), and the federal government has contributed about 15% (roughly $3.5 billion). The 2022 Business Plan indicated additional federal funds would be needed to complete the Merced-to-Bakersfield segment, and set a target of $8 billion to be awarded from the Bipartisan Infrastructure Law for the project. If that target is achieved, about $33 billion would be directed to the project (about 65% state, 35% federal in total). Future state or federal funds of about $2 billion would address full P65 cost estimate.

Construction status and plans

The groundbreaking ceremony for CAHSR was held on January 6, 2015 in Fresno, California.

In the Central Valley major construction projects are underway. Three separate construction packages total  of guideway and 93 structures. As of October 2022,  of guideway are complete, and 39 are underway; 35 structures are complete, and 34 are underway. Exhibit 2.6 from the 2022 Business Plan gives an overall comparison between the packages as of Mar. 31, 2022.
CP4 comprises  adjoining the end of CP2-3 to the intersection of Poplar / Madera Avenue northwest of Shafter. The contractor is California Rail Builders, a joint venture of Ferrovial-Agroman West, LLC and Griffith Company. The design-build contract was signed February 29, 2016. This construction package is forecast to be completed first, by summer 2023.
CP1 comprises  from Avenue 17 north of Madera to East American Avenue south of Fresno. It includes 12 grade separations, two viaducts, one tunnel, a major river crossing over the San Joaquin River, and the realignment of State Route 99. The contractor is the joint venture of Tutor-Perini/Zachry/Parsons. The design-build contract was signed August 16, 2013. This construction package is forecast to be completed next, in 2026.
It includes approximately 36 grade separations, viaducts, underpasses, and overpasses. The contractor is the joint venture of Dragados USA/Flatiron Construction. The design-build contract was signed June 10, 2015. This construction package is forecast to also be completed in 2026.
The Heavy Maintenance Facility (HMF), which will be located in Fresno, is proceeding through the planning and approval process.

Extensions status
These design contracts are expected to last into 2024.

Following these steps, land acquisition, infrastructure construction, and track and systems installation will still need to be accomplished before the extensions can become part of the operable Interim IOS before the end of the decade.

Statewide connectivity ("bookend") projects
According to the Authority: "Connectivity or ‘Bookend’ Projects refer to the billions of dollars in infrastructure investment throughout the state that are part of the California High-Speed Rail system. These funds will strengthen and improve existing rail networks, while also connecting them with California's future high-speed rail system. Senate Bill (SB) 1029 passed by the California Legislature and signed by Governor Brown in July 2012, invests almost $2 billion from the Safe, Reliable, High-Speed Passenger Train Bond Act for the 21st Century (Proposition 1A) into transit, commuter, and intercity rail projects across the state. This funding leverages approximately $5 billion in additional funding for these projects."

Major "bookend" investments are underway to the north and south:
The Caltrain electrification "bookend" investment in the Bay Area (as well as grade separations, etc.) is proceeding, and is expected to be completed in late 2024.
A "bookend" investment in the "Link US" project (Phase A) will shortly begin construction for Los Angeles Union Station. Phase B still needs to be funded.

There are many other connectivity projects partly funded by the Authority. Particularly significant are those which implement Positive Train Control systems on the commuter systems which will be part of the blended system.

Route and stations

The project aims to connect California's major metropolitan areas together, and link to their local commuter systems. It will be built in two major phases.

The number of stations on the completed system was limited by Proposition 1A to 24. Not all station locations have been decided. At the start of operations of the Interim Initial Operating Segment (Interim IOS, Merced to Bakersfield) there will be 5 stations.

Route finalized from Central Valley to San Francisco
Although the Authority is focused on getting the Interim IOS in the Central Valley in operation by the end of the decade, it is also looking ahead to the next step (that is, connecting to San Francisco using the prepared Caltrain blended route). On April 28, 2022 it approved the final route in the San Jose to Merced section. This alignment (Alternative 4) uses the existing Union Pacific Railroad (UPRR) alignment from San Jose to Gilroy as a blended section.

Trains will be able to travel at  even through the tunnels. When tunnel field studies, early engineering, and design work are completed for this section, it will be ready for construction when funding is available. Tunnel construction is anticipated to take up to 6 years to complete once begun.

Route travel-time/speed requirements
Proposition 1A also set the maximum nonstop travel times between certain destinations on the system:

 San Francisco–San Jose: 30 minutes; this would require about 
 San Jose–Los Angeles: 2 hours, 10 minutes; this would require about 
 San Francisco–Los Angeles Union Station: 2 hours, 40 minutes
 San Diego–Los Angeles: 1 hour, 20 minutes 
 Inland Empire–Los Angeles: 30 minutes
 Sacramento–Los Angeles: 2 hours, 20 minutes

In addition, the achievable operating headway between successive trains must be less than 5 minutes.

Trains (rolling stock)

Acquisition
In January 2015, the Authority issued a request for proposal (RFP) for complete trainsets. The proposals received will be reviewed so that acceptable bidders can be selected, and then requests for bids will be sent out.

In February 2015, ten companies formally expressed interest in producing trainsets for the system: Alstom, AnsaldoBreda (now Hitachi Rail Italy), Bombardier Transportation, CSR, Hyundai Rotem, Kawasaki Rail Car, Siemens, Sun Group U.S.A. partnered with CNR Tangshan, and Talgo.

Due to company acquisitions and mergers since then (CSR merged with CNR, and Bombardier Transportation merged with Alstom), the number of companies now qualified for the tender is seven. The qualified companies are Alstom, Siemens Mobility, Talgo, Hitachi Rail Italy, CRRC, Hyundai Rotem, and Kawasaki Rail Car.

An additional factor for the selection of a model is the Buy America regulation for production of rolling stock in the US. The Federal Railroad Administration granted a waiver for two prototypes to be manufactured off-shore. The remaining trainsets would need to be built according to the rules. This requirement was mentioned as a significant reason that Chinese manufacturers dropped out of the Brightline West (then known as XpressWest) project with similar technical trainset specifications.

Included in a May 2022 grant request to the Biden administration is a request for funds to purchase six HSR trainsets. The 2023 Project Update Report projects the purchase of these to be made in 2024. 

The 2023 Update Report states that for the entire Phase 1 system 66 trainsets will be needed.

Train design and station-sharing
The CAHSR trains will use a different standard than Caltrain for their floor height above the rails. To resolve this issue, Caltrain is procuring new Stadler KISS EMUs that have doors at both heights. Each train platform uses either one height or the other, and only a few of the stations will service both types of trainsets. Thus, in the Bay Area most of the stations will be used exclusively by Caltrain and not be able to support CAHSR trainsets.

HSR passenger line operations

Request for Qualifications 
In April 2017, the CHSRA announced it had received five responses to its request for qualifications for the contract to assist with the development and management of the initial phase of the high-speed line and be the Interim IOS operator.
 China HSR ETO Consortium: China Railway International, Beijing Railway Administration, China Railway Eryuan Engineering Group, China Railway Corporation
 DB International US: DB International USA, Deutsche Bahn, Alternate Concepts, HDR
 FS First Rail Group: Ferrovie dello Stato Italiane, FirstGroup, Trenitalia, Rete Ferroviaria Italiana, Centostazioni, Italferr, McKinsey & Company
 Renfe: Renfe Operadora, Globalvia Inversiones, Administrador de Infraestructuras Ferroviarias
 Stagecoach Group: Stagecoach Group, Coach USA

Selected Early Train Operator 
In October 2017, the California High-Speed Rail Authority announced that DB E.C.O. North America Inc (formerly known as DB Engineering & Consulting USA Inc.) had been chosen as the Early Train Operator. This decision came after a Request for Qualifications was put out by the Authority looking for well established groups able to provide operational guidance for the future system once opened.

Services provided by DB International US are:
 Project Management
 Ridership and passenger revenue forecasts
 Preferred revenue collection systems
 Rolling stock fleet size and interior layout
 Service planning and scheduling
 Operations and maintenance cost forecasting
 Station design & operations
 Optimization of life cycle costs
 Procurements
 Fare integration and Interoperability
 Safety and security
 Operations control/dispatching responsibilities
 Maximizing system revenues
 Marketing and branding

Ridership estimates 
DB E.C.O. North America Inc. (the Early Train Operator) has also done an analysis of likely ridership using updated data and a newer model. Based on their estimates per the 2023 Project Update Report, ridership from the service implementation date to 2040 would total about 11.49 million riders annually for the Silicon Valley to Bakersfield service, and 31.28 million riders annually for the entire Phase 1 system. This estimate used a new California Rail Ridership Model, updated assumptions and data (from 2022), revised service plan assumptions, a revised fare policy, and a new rider behavior model.

These ridership estimates show the CAHSR system will have higher projected ridership than all California Amtrak
supported services combined:  6.6 million vs 5.6 million riders. CAHSR will also carry more than two-and-a-half times more riders annually than the 12.5 million riders reported on the Northeast Corridor high speed service.

Legal aspects

This project already has a long history. Topics included in the main History page (the link shown above) include the early history (before 2015), discussion of HSR alternatives, legislation, financing, construction, and legal challenges.

Legislation
In 1996, the California High-Speed Rail Authority (CHSRA) was established to begin formal planning in preparation for a ballot measure in 1998 or 2000.

In 2008, California voters approved Proposition 1A to construct the initial segment of the high-speed rail network, and issued  $9 billion in bonds to begin its construction. It also set certain requirements for the project: 
 Established the basic route linking the major population centers
 Minimum  where conditions permit
 Maximum of 24 stations on the system
 Maximum travel times between certain points
 Financially self-sustaining (operation and maintenance costs fully covered by revenue)
The proposition also authorized an additional $950 million for improvements on local commuter systems, which will serve as feeder systems to the high-speed rail system.

In June 2014, state legislators and Governor Jerry Brown agreed to apportion the state's annual cap and trade funds so that 25% goes to high-speed rail as an ongoing source of funds.

Lawsuits
In 2014, the CHSRA was challenged on its compliance with its statutory obligations under Proposition 1A
(John Tos, Aaron Fukuda, and the Kings County Board of Supervisors v. California High-Speed Rail Authority). In November 2021 a circuit court ruled against the plaintiffs.

On December 15, 2014, the federal Surface Transportation Board determined that its approval of the HSR project in August "categorically preexempts" lawsuits filed under the California Environmental Quality Act (CEQA). This determination was tested in a similar case, Friends of Eel River v. North Coast Railroad Authority. The Supreme Court of California determined on July 27, 2017 that CEQA is not exempted by federal law.

In February 2022, Hollywood Burbank Airport sued the Authority over its approval of the draft EIR for that section of the high-speed railway.

Economic and environmental impacts

In addition to the direct reduction in travel times the HSR project will produce, there are other anticipated benefits, economic and environmental, both generally to the state and to the regions the train will pass through, and also to the areas immediately around the train stations. Some of the items of note include:

Feb. 14, 2023, the Authority announced that 10,000 construction job had been created on the HSR project.

The Central Valley Training Center is a pre-apprenticeship job training program by the project. It has been operating since 2020, and has trained over 100 people and assisted with job placement.

The Authority produces an annual Sustainability Report on its efforts to both build the HSR system in a sustainable way, but also its estimates on the effects of the HSR system. For example, it indicates that the project generated between $12.7 and 13.7 billion in total economic activity in the state, with 56% investment in disadvantaged communities.

The Authority also produces an annual cumulative report on the economic benefits of the HSR project.

Peer review, public opinion, and criticism 
There are two types of review and criticism noted here: the legally established "peer review" process that the California legislature established for an independent check on the Authority's planning and implementation efforts, and public criticisms by groups, media, individuals, public agencies, and elected officials.

At the February 2015 conference Bold Bets: California on the Move?, hosted by The Atlantic magazine and Siemens, Dan Richard, the then-chair of the Authority, warned that not all issues facing the HSR system had been resolved.

Peer Review Group
The California Legislature established the California High-Speed Rail Peer Review Group to provide independent analysis of the Authority's planning and implementation efforts. Their documents are submitted to the Legislature as needed.

The April 1, 2022 report noted a number of positive factors:

 Improved prospects for federal funding with the Biden Administration.
 Disruptions and impacts caused by COVID-19, the war in Ukraine, and inflation are all noted but being dealt with.
 Significant progress has been made on the necessary environmental clearances.
 Greater attention is being given to local transit connectivity and local economic impacts.
 Major improvements have been made to project management and risk mitigation.

However, there were also a number of significant concerns noted:
 The total level of uncertainty has likely increased due to effects of COVID-19 and inflation.
 Prior experience with cost increases and scheduling delays raises some uncertainties about future performance. Cost increases have been over 86%, average delays have been 118%, only 90% of ordinary real estate parcel needed have been acquired, only 63% of railroad parcels have been acquired, and only 65% of utility parcels have been acquired.
 Some of the cost estimates presented were out of date, but expected to be updated in the 2023 Project Update Report.
 Major components of the project (representing over half its cost) have no bidding or contract management experience. Thus, estimates for these are clearly suspect.
 There are critical issues regarding management and legal issues with other agencies for the operation of the system which remain unresolved. (There are a number of these listed, as well as unknown long term impacts of COVID-19 on ridership and inflation.)
 Adequate legislative oversight is lacking.
 Per the report, "[O]verall project funding remains inadequate and unstable making effective management extremely difficult. In addition, the Authority has no clear guidance from the Legislature on the next steps in the project."
 "Even with a realistic share of new Federal funding, the project cannot get outside the Central Valley without added state or local funding from sources not yet identified."

Professional studies of blended systems
Study #1. Eric Eidlin, an employee of the Federal Transit Administration (Region 9, San Francisco), wrote a study in 2015 funded by the German Marshall Fund of the United States comparing the structural differences of two HSR European systems and their historical development with California's HSR system. He also focused on the issue of station siting, design, use, and impact on the surrounding community. From this, he developed ten recommendations for CAHSRA. Among these are:
 Develop bold, long-term visions for the HSR corridors and stations.
 Where possible, site HSR stations in central city locations.
 In rural areas, emphasize train speed; in urban areas, emphasize transit connectivity.
 Plan for and encourage the non-transit roles of the HSR stations.
Eidlin's study also notes that in California there has been debate on the disadvantages of the proposed blended service in the urban areas of San Francisco and Los Angeles, including reduced speeds, more operating restraints, and complicated track-sharing agreements. There are some inherent advantages in blended systems that have not received much attention: shorter transfer distances for passengers, and reduced impacts on the neighborhoods. Blended systems are in use in Europe.

Study #2. A 202-page study by A. Loukaitou-Sideris, D. Peters, and W. Wei of the Mineta Transportation Institute at San Jose State University in 2015 compared examples of "blended systems" in Spain and Germany where conventional and high-speed rail (HSR) services either used the same tracks over a portion of track or at a specific station. The study found that blended systems were cheaper to build, required less space, and provided easy transfers between different modes of transportation, but resulted in lower system capacity (due to greater separation distances required when combining HSR and conventional traffic), were often not possible to properly implement in urban areas due to the additional land area requirements for passing sidings, resulted in additional challenges in operations, and caused frequent delays.

Public opposition
In 2008 the Reason Foundation, the Howard Jarvis Taxpayers Association, and Citizens Against Government Waste published a study which they named the "Due Diligence Report" critiquing the project. In 2013, the Reason Foundation published an "Updated Due Diligence Report". Key elements of the updated critique include:
 operating train speed higher than any existing HSR system at the time
 unrealistic ridership projections
 increasing costs
 no clear funding plan
 incorrect assumptions regarding HSR alternatives
 increasing fare projections
This 2013 critique was based on the 2012 Business Plan. Although the 2012 Business Plan has been superseded by the 2022 Business Plan, the critique does include the Blended System approach using commuter tracks in SF and LA.

James Fallows in The Atlantic magazine summarized public criticism thus, "It will cost too much, take too long, use up too much land, go to the wrong places, and in the end won't be fast or convenient enough to do that much good anyway."

In 2013, a different type of criticism was leveled at the proposed HSR system when the idea of using a  "blended" system with Caltrain was promoted. It was felt that this idea did not meet the original Proposition 1A plan due to the resulting lower operating speeds, fewer trips, and fewer riders.

Public opinion 
Public approval for CAHSR has remained steady over the years:

In April 2022, UC Berkeley's Institute of Government Studies released a survey of registered voters that found 56% supported continuing the high-speed rail project even if "its operations only extend from Bakersfield to Merced in the Central Valley by the year 2030 and to the Bay Area by the year 2033." Approval varies by political affiliation with 73% of Democrats backing the project versus 25% of Republicans.

An older statewide survey, in March 2016, by the Public Policy Institute of California (PPIC) indicated that 52% of Californians support the project, while 63% of Californians think the project is either "very important" or "somewhat important" for California's economy and quality of life. Support varies by location (with the San Francisco Bay Area the highest at 63%, and lowest in Orange/San Diego at 47%), by race (Asians 66%, Latinos 58%, Whites 44%, and Blacks 42%), by age (declining sharply with increasing age), and by political orientation (Democrats 59%, independents 47%, and Republicans 29%). Dan Richard, then-chair of the Authority, said in an interview with James Fallows that he believes approval levels will increase when people can start seeing progress, and trains start running.

In 2008, voters approved Proposition 1A with 52.6%.

Las Vegas HSR project
Brightline West (formerly Desert Xpress and XpressWest) is a project that since 2007 has been planning to build a high-speed rail line between Southern California and Las Vegas, Nevada, part of the "Southwest Rail Network" they hope to create. The rail line would begin in Las Vegas and cross the Mojave Desert stopping  outside of Victorville, California and eventually terminating in Rancho Cucamonga (located in the Inland Empire, where it would connect with CAHSR and Metrolink).

As of November 2022, a start date for construction of Brightline West is set for the first half of 2023.

Further study

The Authority's documents

The Authority's latest financial projections and its current implementation strategy are discussed in detail in the 2023 Project Status Report.

The Authority's Business Plan describes the project's goals, financing, and development plans. It is updated every even year (since 2008), and must be submitted to the Legislature by May 1.

The Authority's Update Report gives a program-wide summary, as well as information for each project section, in order to clearly describe the project's status. It is produced every odd year (since 2015, except for 2021), and must be submitted to the Legislature by March 1.

The Authority's Newsroom provides frequent news releases concerning all aspects of the project.

The Authority's Info Center provides factsheets, regional newsletters, maps, and video simulations of route "fly-overs".

Independent reviews
The California Peer Review Group produces independent analysis of the project for the state legislature. Its documents are not currently available on its website.

The state legislature also has provided that independent financial review be conducted of the Authority's plans. The firm Project Finance Advisory Limited (“PFAL”) was selected to do this beginning in November 2015. The September 2022 review is available at Independent Financial Advisor Report To California High-Speed Rail Authority Regarding: Proposition 1A Funding Plan.

Other documents
In 2014-2015, James Fallows wrote a series of 17 articles  for The Atlantic about the HSR system. The series covered many aspects of the system, criticisms of it, and responses to those criticisms.

The High Speed Rail Alliance is a non-profit organization dedicated to promoting high speed rail systems in the United States. They have information nation-wide about current developments as well as plans and tutorials.

References

External links

 California High-Speed Rail Authority
 California High Speed Rail Peer Review Group
 California State Rail Modernization Plan (2023 Draft)
 DB E.C.O. North America Inc.

 
Deutsche Bahn
Electric railways in California
High-speed railway lines in the United States
Passenger rail transportation in California
Proposed railway lines in California
25 kV AC railway electrification
2029 in rail transport
Megaprojects
High-speed railway lines under construction
Transportation buildings and structures in Madera County, California
Buildings and structures under construction in the United States
High-speed trains of the United States
Rail junctions in the United States